Brasero is a free and open-source disc-burning program for Unix-like operating systems, it serves as a graphical front-end (using GTK) to cdrtools, cdrskin, growisofs, and (optionally) libburn. Licensed under the terms of the GNU General Public License.

History
Brasero was developed by Philippe Rouquier & Luis Medinas. The project was originally named Bonfire, but was renamed after the Spanish word brasero for a small heater used to provide warmth for people sitting at a table.

Early releases of the application were well received. In a review in April 2007 published in Free Software Magazine Robin Monks concluded:

After further development and the inclusion of Brasero 0.7.1 in Ubuntu 8.04 Hardy Heron in April 2008 the application received further press reviews. In May 2008 Ryan Paul of Ars Technica said:

Brasero was later integrated into GNOME and the version numbers were aligned with GNOME desktop version numbering. Ars Technica reviewed Brasero 2.26, then the newest version, in March 2009, saying:

Brasero was at one time the default CD/DVD application in the GNOME desktop, but with more modern computer hardware omitting optical drives, it was removed from the GNOME core feature set with version 3.8 in 2013.

Features

Data
Brasero supports both CD and DVD formats. It allows for editing of the disc contents and can remove, move and rename files that are located inside folders. It can also burn data to CD/DVDs on the fly.

The application allows automatic filtering for unwanted files, including hidden files, broken and recursive symlinks and files not conforming to the Joliet CD standard. Brasero supports multisessions, the Joliet extension and can create an image of the user's hard drive.

Audio
When creating audio CDs Brasero writes CD-TEXT information automatically found, using GStreamer. It also supports the editing of CD-TEXT information and can burn audio CDs on the fly. It can use all audio file formats handled by GStreamer local installation, including Ogg, FLAC and MP3. Brasero can also search for audio files that are inside dropped folders.

Copying
Brasero is capable of copying a CD/DVD to the user's hard drive in iso format and can copy DVDs and CDs on the fly. It supports single-session data DVDs and any type of CD.

Other features
Brasero can also erase CD/DVDs, save and load ongoing projects and can burn CD and DVD images and cue files.

It includes a song, image and video previewer using the GStreamer multimedia framework. When operating on a Linux kernel newer than 2.6.13 it provides file change notification.

When used with GDL, Brasero has a customizable user interface.

The application supports drag and drop as well as cut and paste from the Nautilus (GNOME file manager) and also other applications. It can use files from a network when the protocol is handled via GVfs. It can search for files using Tracker, allowing a search that is based on keywords or on file type. Brasero can also display a playlist and its contents. Playlists are automatically searched using Tracker.

See also

 List of optical disc authoring software

References

External links
 

Free optical disc authoring software
Free software programmed in C
GNOME Applications
Linux CD/DVD writing software
Optical disc-related software that uses GTK